Hyphoradulum is a genus of fungi in the Cyphellaceae family. The genus is monotypic, containing the single species Hyphoradulum conspicuum, found in Europe.

References

External links
 

Cyphellaceae
Taxa described in 1987
Fungi of Europe
Monotypic Agaricales genera